Forreston may refer to:

Australia
 Forreston, South Australia

United States
 Forreston, Illinois
 Forreston, Mississippi
 Forreston, Texas